Uusi Nainen (Finnish: New Women) was a Finnish communist women's magazine published in Helsinki, Finland. The magazine existed between 1945 and 2008.

History and profile
Uusi Nainen was established in 1945. The founder organization was Suomen Naisten Demokraattinen Liitton (Finnish: Finnish Women's Democratic Organization). It had a different approach in contrast to mainstream women's magazines in the 1960s which made the magazine a progressive alternative to the others. Because it was critical of fashion and commercial culture. Uusi Nainen overtly carried Soviet propaganda and was under the control of and financed by the Communist Party of Finland, which in turn, was closely related to the Communist Party of the Soviet Union. The magazine became the media outlet of Finnish Women's Democratic League in 1990. It folded in 2008.

References

1945 establishments in Finland
2008 disestablishments in Finland
Communist magazines
Defunct political magazines published in Finland
Finnish-language magazines
Magazines established in 1945
Magazines disestablished in 2008
Magazines published in Helsinki
Propaganda newspapers and magazines
Women's magazines published in Finland
Women in Helsinki